The Freeport Jet Wash Jets are one of the four women's GBFL franchises that play in Freeport, Bahamas. They share the same field with Freeport F.C.

Football clubs in the Bahamas